The Lone Star was an Amtrak passenger train that ran between Chicago and Houston, or Dallas via Kansas City, Wichita, Oklahoma City, and Fort Worth. The train was renamed from the Texas Chief, which the Atchison, Topeka and Santa Fe Railway had introduced in 1948. Amtrak discontinued the Lone Star in 1979.

History 

The Santa Fe introduced the Texas Chief on April 3, 1948, between Chicago and Galveston, Texas via Kansas City, Wichita, Oklahoma City, Fort Worth, and Houston. It was truncated to Houston in early 1967.

From 1955 until 1968, a section would cut off at Gainesville, Texas to serve Denton, Texas and Dallas.

Santa Fe conveyed the Texas Chief to Amtrak at the latter's inception in 1971. Amtrak changed the train's name from Texas Chief to Lone Star on May 19, 1974, after the Santa Fe determined that Amtrak's trains no longer met its service standards and demanded that Amtrak stop using the "Chief" name.

The train was popular with students of the many colleges and universities along its route, such as the University of Kansas, University of Missouri-Kansas City, Wichita State University and the University of Oklahoma. It provided economical transportation to and from school. In the fiscal year 1976, the train carried 274,448 passengers. 

Amtrak considered, but rejected, a Dallas through routing because of concerns over the Dallas station, choosing to instead add a Fort Worth–Dallas section on July 1, 1975. The Dallas through cars were temporarily discontinued between October 1976 and February 15, 1977, during which time the Lone Star was combined with the Chicago–Los Angeles Southwest Limited (itself the successor of another Santa Fe mainstay, the Super Chief) between Chicago and Kansas City.

Due to cuts by Congress as part of the Amtrak Reorganization Act of 1979pressed by the US Department of Transportation under the Carter administrationthe Lone Star was discontinued on October 8, 1979, leaving Oklahoma without passenger train service until 1999. Chicago–Houston service was retained by adding a Houston section to the Chicago–Laredo Inter-American, which split at Temple. At the time of its discontinuance, the Lone Star was Amtrak's seventh most popular long-distance train. The Houston section remained until 1981, when the Inter-American itself was cut back to San Antonio and renamed the Eagle.

Current service along former route 

Of the original Texas Chief/Lone Star route, only the Newton, Kansas–Wichita-Oklahoma City and Temple–Houston-Galveston segments remain without passenger train service. Chicago–Newton is served by Amtrak's Southwest Chief (itself the successor of another Santa Fe mainstay, the Super Chief), while Oklahoma City–Fort Worth is served by Amtrak's Heartland Flyer. While the Newton–Wichita–Oklahoma City portion does not have passenger train service, it has been served by Amtrak Thruway since April 2016 and a revival of Amtrak service is proposed. In June 2021, Amtrak released a plan that would add two more round trips between Oklahoma City and Fort Worth while extending the original round trip to Newton. A timeline for the service has not been determined.

Chicago–Dallas service is provided by Amtrak's Texas Eagle via a different route than the Lone Star.

Potential restoration

In June 2021, Senator Jon Tester (D-Montana) added an amendment to the Surface Transportation Investment Act of 2021 which requires the Department of Transportation (not Amtrak itself) to evaluate the restoration of discontinued long-distance routes, such as the Lone Star. The bill passed the Senate Commerce Committee with bipartisan support, and was later rolled into President Biden's Infrastructure Investment and Jobs Act, which was passed into law in November 2021. The report must be delivered to Congress within two years. The law also provides $2.4 billion in new funds to Amtrak's long-distance route network.

On October 28, 2022, the Amtrak Daily Long-Distance Service Study was announced by the Federal Railroad Administration. Its purpose is to evaluate the restoration and addition of discontinued and new long-distance passenger services, as well as the upgrading of tri-weekly long-distance services (the Sunset Limited and the Cardinal) to daily operation. The criteria for either restoring or creating new long-distance routes are that they connect large and small communities as part of a "regional rail network", provide economic and social well-being for rural areas, provide "enhanced connectivity" for the existing long-distance passenger trains, and reflect the support and engagement of the locals and region for restored long-distance passenger service. These criteria include the Lone Star, among other trains. The study will take place through 2023, and will engage with stakeholders, the rail companies, and communities as it "evaluates how to better connect people with long-distance rail services".

Equipment 
During 1976–1977 when the Lone Star combined with the Southwest Chief between Chicago and Kansas City, the Lone Star consisted of two baggage cars, two Hi-Level coaches, a dormitory bar-lounge, an ex-Santa Fe dining car, two 10-roomette/6-bedroom Pine-series sleeping cars, and a 48-seat single-level coach. One baggage car, one sleeping car, and the single-level coach operated through to Dallas.

References

External links
1979 timetable

Former Amtrak routes
Railway services introduced in 1974
Night trains of the United States
Railway services discontinued in 1979
Former long distance Amtrak routes
Proposed Amtrak routes